The Nivolet Pass ( or ) is a mountain pass in the Eastern group of the Graian Alps in northern Italy. It is located at the top of the Orco Valley on the road from Turin to Ceresole Reale, in the Gran Paradiso National Park. Beyond the pass, the road terminates in the upper reaches of the eponymous Valsavarenche valley in the Gran Paradiso mountain group, before the valley descends to Valsavarenche and Villeneuve. The colle forms part of the boundary between the Aosta Valley and the Piedmont region.  The highest point of the paved road is 2,641 metres (8,665 feet). Two artificial lakes, Serrù Lake and Agnel Lake, are located immediately below the pass.

The approach road from Agnel Lake was the location of several scenes in the film The Italian Job, including the iconic final bus crash.

See also
 List of highest paved roads in Europe
 List of mountain passes

References

Gallery

Mountain passes of the Alps
Mountain passes of Piedmont
Mountain passes of Aosta Valley
Climbs in cycle racing in Italy